Aspen Woods is a residential neighbourhood in the southwest quadrant of Calgary, Alberta, consisting mostly of acreages and single-family detached homes.

Aspen Woods was established as a neighbourhood in 2001, on land annexed to the City of Calgary in 1956. It is represented in the Calgary City Council by the Ward 6 councillor.

Demographics 

Residents in this community had a median household income of $89,939 in 2000, and there were no low income residents living in the neighbourhood. As of 2000, 11.5% of the residents were immigrants. 12.5% of the housing was used for renting.

See also 
List of neighbourhoods in Calgary

References

External links 
Strathcona Park - Christie Park - Aspen Woods Community Association

Neighbourhoods in Calgary